The 46th (South Devonshire) Regiment of Foot was an infantry regiment of the British Army, raised in 1741. Under the Childers Reforms it amalgamated with the 32nd (Cornwall) Regiment of Foot to form the Duke of Cornwall's Light Infantry in 1881, becoming the 2nd Battalion of the new regiment.

History

Early wars

The regiment was raised in Newcastle upon Tyne by John Price as John Price's Regiment of Foot in 1741. The regiment proceeded to Scotland and took part in the Battle of Prestonpans in September 1745 during the Jacobite rising. It was ranked as the 57th Regiment of Foot in 1747 but re-ranked as the 46th Regiment of Foot in 1751. After eight years' service in Ireland, the regiment embarked for Nova Scotia in May 1757 for service in the French and Indian War. The regiment saw action at the assault on Fort Ticonderoga in July 1758 the assault and capture of Fort Niagara in July 1759 and the Montreal Campaign in August to September 1760.

The regiment then moved to the West Indies in October 1761 and took part in the capture of Martinique in January 1762, the storming of Morro Castle in July 1762 and the capture of Havana in August 1762. The regiment returned home in 1767.

The regiment arrived at in North Carolina in April 1776 for service in the American Revolutionary War. It fought at the Battle of Sullivan's Island in June 1776, Battle of Long Island in August 1776, the Battle of White Plains in October 1776 and the Battle of Fort Washington in November 1776. It saw further action during the Philadelphia campaign at the Battle of Brandywine in September 1777 the Battle of Paoli also in September 1777 and the Battle of Germantown in October 1777. It was following the British attack on the Americans at Paoli, where the light company of the regiment took no prisoners and the Americans demanded vengeance, that the regiment decided to insert identifying red feathers in their shako helmets to prevent anyone else suffering on their account: hence the nickname the Red Feathers. The regiment went on to fight at the Battle of Monmouth in June 1778 and operations against New Bedford and Martha's Vineyard in September 1778. It sailed for the West Indies in November 1778 and took part in the attack on Saint Lucia and the Battle of Vigie in December 1778. The regiment returned to England and was renamed the 46th (South Devonshire) Regiment of Foot in 1782.

Napoleonic Wars

The regiment embarked for the West Indies in November 1794 and helped suppress an insurrection by caribs on Saint Vincent before returning home in November 1796. It returned to the West Indies in April 1804 and, fighting alongside the 1st West India Regiment in February 1805, defended Dominica against a French force for over a week until the French abandoned the attack; hence the regiment's first battle honour "Dominica". The regiment took part in another action when in May 1806 when 40 of its soldiers boarded the packet boat Duke of Montrose and set out in pursuit of the French privateers Napoleon and Impériale: they captured the Impériale and its crew. The regiment took part in the invasion of Martinique in February 1809 and then returned to England in December 1811.

Colonial Australia
The regiment embarked for New South Wales in August 1813: they were stationed at Hobart on Van Diemens Land with orders to suppress a gang of bushrangers. In April 1816, Governor Lachlan Macquarie issued orders for the regiment to undertake punitive expeditions against Aboriginal groups in the Nepean, Hawkesbury and Grose River valleys in New South Wales. The regiment was to take as many prisoners as they could; if anyone refused to surrender, the soldiers were to "fire upon and compel them to surrender, breaking and destroying the spears, clubs and waddies of all those you take prisoners". Furthermore, if the soldiers did kill anyone, Macquarie ordered their bodies to be "hanged up on trees in conspicuous situations, to strike the survivors with greater terror". The orders issued by Macquarie would then be replicated by other colonial officials in Australia during the Australian frontier wars of the 19th and early 20th centuries. The regiment then sailed for Madras in September 1817 and, after a tour on the Indian subcontinent, returned to England in March 1833.

The Victorian era
The regiment was sent to the Crimea in summer 1854 and saw action at the Battle of Alma in September 1854, the Battle of Balaclava in October 1854 and the Battle of Inkerman in November 1854 as well as the Siege of Sebastopol in winter 1854.

As part of the Cardwell Reforms of the 1870s, where single-battalion regiments were linked together to share a single depot and recruiting district in the United Kingdom, the 46th was linked with the 32nd (Cornwall) Regiment of Foot, and assigned to district no. 35 at Victoria Barracks, Bodmin. On 1 July 1881 the Childers Reforms came into effect and the regiment amalgamated with the 32nd (Cornwall) Regiment of Foot to form the Duke of Cornwall's Light Infantry, becoming the 2nd Battalion (with the 32nd (Cornwall) Regiment of Foot becoming the 1st Battalion).

Battle Honours
Battle honours were:
Dominica (1805)
Crimean War: Sevastopol

Colonels
Colonels of the regiment were:

1741–1743: Brig-Gen. John Price
1743–1764: Lt-Gen. Hon. Thomas Murray

The 46th Regiment of Foot - (1748)
1764–1775: Gen. Sir William (Howe), 5th Viscount Howe, KB
1775–1795: Lt-Gen. Hon. Sir John Vaughan, KB

The 46th (South Devon) Regiment - (1782)
1795–1804: Gen. Sir James Henry Craig, KB
1804–1816: Gen. John Whyte
1816–1838: Gen. Henry Wynyard
1838–1839: Lt-Gen. Sir John Keane, 1st Baron Keane, GCB, GCH
1839–1843: Lt-Gen. John Ross, CB
1843–1853: Gen. Sir John Hamilton Dalrymple, Bt., later 8th Earl of Stair, KT
1853–1854: Lt-Gen. Richard Egerton, CB
1854–1860: Gen. Sir John Pennefather, GCB
1860: Lt-Gen. John Geddes, KH
1860–1861: Gen. Thomas Gerrard Ball
1861–1870: Lt-Gen. Sir Charles Ash Windham, KCB
1870:Lt-Gen. Edward Hungerford Delaval Elers Napier
1870–1881: Gen. Charles Stuart

References

Sources
 
 
 

Military units and formations established in 1741
Military units and formations in Devon
Regiments of the British Army in the Crimean War
Regiments of the British Army in the American Revolutionary War
Military units and formations disestablished in 1881
Duke of Cornwall's Light Infantry